Merry Point is an unincorporated community in Lancaster County in the U. S. state of Virginia.

Verville was listed on the National Register of Historic Places in 1987.

References

Unincorporated communities in Lancaster County, Virginia
Unincorporated communities in Virginia